Konergino (Chukchi: , Kèňiergyn) is a village (selo) in Iultinsky District of Chukotka Autonomous Okrug, in the Far Eastern Federal District of Russia. Population  Municipally, Konergino is subordinated to Iultinsky Municipal District and incorporated as Konergino Rural Settlement.

Geography
Like other villages in the district such as Amguema, Konergino is a reindeer-herding settlement. The settlement is located on the eastern shore of Kresta Bay, south of Egvekinot. The village's name is derived from the Chukchi Kei'i'yergyn, meaning "curved valley". The village has a high school, a cultural center, a daycare center, a food store.

History
Founded in 1927, Konergino was originally part of the Nutepelmen Agricultural Soviet and belonged to Anadyrsky District At that time the housing in the village conssited of little more than a few huts and Yarangas. However, in 1939, Konergino was split off from the Nutepelmen Soviet and established as its own kholkoz. Following this establishment, a new warehouse was built along with wooden frame and stone houses. In 1953, a hospital was constructed in the village along with a boarding school, with a kindergarten being added two years later. In 1984 a two-storey secondary school was completed.

The main occupation of the inhabitants are reindeer herding and agriculture farmers. The village is the central base for the municipal agricultural enterprise "Revival". The village has a boarding school, outpatients clinic, a post office, communications center, clubhouse and two shops. The surrounding villages are an old airfield and Olovyannaya Bay the site of the landing of the founders of the settlement. To date, all the houses of the village are in a state of disrepair. In the future, the construction of new housing.

Demographics
The population according to the most recent census results is 424, of which 279 are men and 252 women, a significant reduction on a 2006 estimate of 560; which itself is flat against a 2003 estimate of 559, of whom the vast majority were Chukchi.

Transport
Konergino is not connected to any other part of the world by road however, there exists a small road network within the village including: 

улица Комсомольская (Ulitsa Komsomolskaya, lit. Komsomol Street)
улица Ленина (Ulitsa Lenina, lit. Lenin Street)
улица Октябрьская (Ulitsa Oktyabrskaya, lit. October Street)
улица Ровтытагина (Ulitsa Rovtytagina)
улица Чукотская (Ulitsa Chukotskaya, lit. Chukotka Street)
улица Школьная (Ulitsa Shkolnaya, lit. School Street)

Climate
Konergino has an arctic tundra climate (Köppen climate classification ET) with bitterly cold, very long winters and short, cool summers.

See also
List of inhabited localities in Iultinsky District

References

Sources
 
 

M Strogoff, P-C Brochet, and D. Auzias Petit Futé: Chukotka (2006). "Avant-Garde" Publishing House.

External links
Konergino photo gallery

Rural localities in Chukotka Autonomous Okrug
Populated places of Arctic Russia